Night Flight is a nightclub, strip club, and restaurant in Moscow located on Tverskaya Street, close to the Red Square.

References

External links
Night Flight Official Website, NightFlight.ru, accessed 2007-12-09
Striptease and Gentlemen Clubs in Moscow way to Russia, accessed 2007-12-09

Tourist attractions in Moscow
Nightclubs in Russia